Xeno Crisis is a 2019 twin-stick shooter from independent developer Bitmap Bureau for the Mega Drive, with releases for the Nintendo Switch, PlayStation 4, PlayStation Vita, Xbox One, Microsoft Windows, macOS, Linux, Sega Dreamcast, Evercade, and Neo Geo. The game was fully funded on Kickstarter on January 10, 2018, with a release on October 28, 2019.

Gameplay
Xeno Crisis is inspired by similar arcade shooters like Smash TV and Shock Troopers, with art direction inspired by the Alien movie franchise. Featuring single or cooperative gameplay, one or two players play as unnamed space marines and work their way through seven levels in a scientific facility featuring procedurally generated rooms and levels, with a number of enemies of various difficulty in each room, concluding with a final boss battle at the end of most levels. After a player kills enemies on screen, a chance of an item, a weapon drop, health, or dogtags are dropped to aid the player. Dogtags are used as an in-game currency to help purchase upgrades like additional health or player speed. To increase the challenge to players, the starting machine gun has a limited amount of ammunition, and weapon pickups have a limited number of uses, requiring players to stay on the move and on the lookout for ammunition boxes.

Plot
The game begins with Commander Darius receiving a distress signal from Outpost 88, a scientific research facility. The two controllable space marines are sent on a drop ship to the facility, where they begin to work their way through each level of the facility, where they face off against aliens, robot defenses, and even Cthulhu, on their way to figure out what is going on. Along the way the two space marines find survivors of the facility that they are able to rescue and release to safety. When the space marines reach the final stage, they are confronted by Dr. Herzog, where he reveals that he was behind the various horrors the space marines battled up to this point. If either space marines drank any "elixers" (the continue feature in the game), or if the player used any cheat codes, Dr. Herzog reveals to them that these elixers were designed by himself and they contained nanomachines that will kill the player characters and the game will end with the "bad" ending. If the player did not use any elixers before confronting Dr. Herzog, he will attack the player as the game's final boss where he reveals himself to be a creature like the creatures battled up to this point. When they players defeat Dr. Herzog, the "good" ending will be revealed with the two space marines evacuating the facility.

Reception
Reception to Xeno Crisis was generally positive. Nintendo Life praised the game's design and gameplay, but criticized the difficulty as being off-putting for inexperienced players. Wireframe also praised the game's polish and gameplay, but criticized some design decisions like the weapon upgrades and the melee attack feature.

References

External links
 Bitmap Bureau
 Development blog

2019 video games
Indie video games
Twin-stick shooters
Neo Geo games
Linux games
MacOS games
Sega Genesis games
Nintendo Switch games
PlayStation 4 games
Xbox Cloud Gaming games
Xbox One games
Video games about extraterrestrial life
Video games developed in the United Kingdom
Windows games
Dreamcast homebrew games
Homebrew software
Kickstarter-funded video games
Single-player video games
Cooperative video games
Multiplayer and single-player video games